Gavij or Gevij or Govij may refer to:
 Gavij, East Azerbaijan (گويج - Gavīj)
 Gavij, South Khorasan (گاويج - Gāvīj)